Christine Thelma Ennew OBE (born April 1960) is the Provost of the University of Warwick.

Ennew's early academic career was as an agricultural economist at the University of Newcastle upon Tyne. She subsequently moved into marketing and became the professor of marketing at the University of Nottingham.

She was made OBE in Queen Elizabeth II's 2016 Birthday Honours list.

Selected publications
 The Marketing Blueprint: Business Blueprints. Wiley-Blackwell, 1993. 
 Financial Services Marketing: An International Guide to Principles and Practice. Routledge, 2013. (With Nigel Waite)

References

Living people
1960 births
Members of the Order of the British Empire
Academics of the University of Warwick
Academics of the University of Nottingham
British women academics
Agricultural economists
Alumni of the University of Cambridge
Alumni of the University of Nottingham